J. Cunningham may refer to:
J. Cunningham (rugby)
Joy Cunningham, British tennis player – see 1935 Wimbledon Championships – Women's Singles